Pope Theodosios III of Alexandria, 79th Pope of Alexandria and Patriarch of the See of St. Mark.

He was a monk at the Monastery of Saint Fana.

13th-century Coptic Orthodox popes of Alexandria
1300 deaths